Polystachya puberula is a species of orchid native to western and west-central tropical Africa.

See also

puberula
Orchids of Africa